Thomas Kirkwood may refer to:

 Tom Kirkwood (born 1951), English biologist
 Thomas William Kirkwood (1884–?), Scottish polo player